Carlos Alberto Galeana Irra (born December 21, 1988, in Lázaro Cárdenas, Michoacán) is a Mexican professional footballer. He currently plays as a defender for Celaya F.C. in the Ascenso MX, wearing jersey #3.

Club career
He made his debut August 1, 2009 against Chiapas. A game which resulted in a 2–0 victory for Toluca. He has also played for Toluca in the 2009–10 CONCACAF Champions League.

References

External links
 Profile - AscensoMX

1988 births
Living people
Footballers from Michoacán
Mexican footballers
People from Lázaro Cárdenas, Michoacán
Association football defenders
Atlético Mexiquense footballers
Deportivo Toluca F.C. players
Lobos BUAP footballers
Club Celaya footballers
Liga MX players